Aramaic people may refer to:

 Ancient Aramaic people, variant term for the ancient Aramean people
 Modern Aramaic people, variant term for the modern Aramean people
 Aramaic-speaking peoples, various peoples who speak Aramaic, ancient or modern
 Aramaic-speaking Jewish people, Aramaic-speaking Jewish diasporas

See also
 Aramaic (disambiguation)
 Aramean (disambiguation)